Cratena lineata is a species of sea slug, an aeolid nudibranch, a marine gastropod mollusc in the family Facelinidae.

Distribution
This species was described from Zanzibar. It has been reported from widespread localities throughout the Indo-Pacific Oceans.

References

Facelinidae
Gastropods described in 1905